La Maison Simons, commonly known as Simons, is a fashion retailer in Canada, headquartered in Quebec City, Quebec. It is a family business currently operated by Richard and Peter Simons. The business was established in 1840 by the son of a Scottish immigrant to Quebec as a dry goods store. In the 1960s, the focus of the business changed to a department store, incorporating youth-oriented brands. Beginning in 1981, La Maison Simons began an expansion across Quebec. In 2012, the company expanded its business to the West Edmonton Mall in Alberta first, before opening several more stores across Canada. The success of the location at the West Edmonton Mall led to the company being sought out as a key anchor tenant at malls across Canada. Primarily a privately held firm, La Maison Simons received outside investment for the first time in its history in 2018 when it sought to open a distribution centre in Quebec City.

History

Peter Simons, born in Scotland in 1785, arrived in Lower Canada in 1812, settling on a small farm near Quebec City in Beauport. Peter Simons raised a family of five, including a son, John Simons, who went on to open a small dry goods shop in Quebec City in 1840 at the age of 17. Placing an emphasis on quality merchandise, he made more than 70 crossings of the Atlantic Ocean in order to seek out quality English and Scottish goods to stock as merchandise.

In 1870, John Simons moved his shop to 20 Côte de la Fabrique, where it remains today. Business increased following the move, and in 1952 the post-World War II boom brought new market opportunities. This is when  entered the company and led the store into a new era, transforming it into a department store where it became leader in popular fashion with the introduction of youth-centred and fashion forward brands such as Twik, which was based on Twiggy, a cultural icon of the time.

Expansion
1961 marked a turning point for La Maison Simons as it entered a growth phase with its new store in Place Sainte-Foy where home decor was introduced as well as new brands for men and women in their thirties and forties. In 1981, a new store opened in Galeries de la Capitale, also in Quebec City. La Maison Simons opened new locations in Sherbrooke and Montreal, Quebec in 1999. Two years later in 2001, a store was opened at Promenades Saint-Bruno. The final new location in the burst of expansion was in 2002, when La Maison Simons opened a new store in Laval, Quebec.

In 2012, Simons expanded to its seventh and largest location at West Edmonton Mall, its first outside of Quebec. It spent nearly $50 million on the store alone. The success of the location led other shopping malls to seek out La Maison Simons as an anchor tenant. On March 27, 2013, Simons announced it would open a new location in Ottawa, Ontario's Rideau Centre in 2015 (although the store did not actually open until August 2016). This was followed by an announcement on December 6, 2013, stating that a flagship store was to open at Square One Shopping Centre in Mississauga, in spring 2016. The new store, which opened in March 2016, occupies a large portion of the former Sears Canada store.

A new store in Gatineau, Quebec, opened on August 13, 2015, investing $21 million in the location. Furthermore, in 2015, a location opened at Park Royal Shopping Centre in West Vancouver, British Columbia. A store in Calgary, Alberta, opened on March 16, 2017, in the Lancaster Building as part of The Core shopping mall. In August 2017, La Maison Simons opened a new store in Edmonton, Alberta, at Londonderry Mall. In May 2018, La Maison Simons received outside investment for the first time in its history as part of efforts to open a new distribution centre in Quebec City.

Locations
The chain includes 15 stores throughout Canada. It also has business offices in London, Paris, Florence and Hong Kong.

Alberta
 The Core Shopping Centre, Calgary
 Londonderry Mall, Edmonton
 West Edmonton Mall, Edmonton

Quebec
 Les Promenades Gatineau, Gatineau
 CF Carrefour Laval, Laval
 Downtown Montreal, Montreal
 Galeries d'Anjou, Montreal
 Fairview Pointe-Claire, Pointe-Claire
 Galeries de la Capitale, Quebec City
 Old Quebec, Quebec City
 Place Sainte-Foy, Quebec City
 Promenades Saint-Bruno, Saint-Bruno-de-Montarville
 Carrefour de l'Estrie, Sherbrooke

Ontario
 Square One Shopping Centre, Mississauga
 CF Rideau Centre, Ottawa

British Columbia
 Park Royal Shopping Centre, West Vancouver

Future locations
2022: Halifax Shopping Centre, Halifax, Nova Scotia

Cultural

The fountain was originally positioned in Bordeaux's Allées de Tourny, named after Aubert Tourny, a French intendant remembered for his contribution to the beautification of Bordeaux, Quebec City's sister city. It was built in the mid-19th century and won a gold medal at the Paris world exposition of 1855. The Fontaine de Tourny was installed in front of the National Assembly of Quebec in April 2007.

In August 2008, the retailer chose to withdraw its fall catalogue after complaints its models were too thin.

Simons store locations are each uniquely designed. The current CEO, Peter Simons, said in an interview with Canadian Business "We’re trying to hold on to this belief in creativity and architecture and art. We’re working with Doug Coupland, for instance, on an art piece in Vancouver, and we try to do that with all the stores we build." All stores incorporate art installations and unique architectural elements.

Company struggles 
In February 2020, Canada Goose ended its wholesale agreement with La Maison Simons, which accounted for millions in sales for the company. At the same time and through the COVID-19 pandemic in Canada, Simons was having troubles with credit insurance on deliveries and all stock from designers, such as Balmain, had been moved to Simons' website. In August 2020, La Maison Simons claims to have regained profitability and sent letters to vendors in July assuring payment in full and fall deliveries will be delayed to preserve cash.

See also

List of Canadian department stores
Holt Renfrew, another fashion store founded in Quebec City in the mid-19th century

References

External links
 Official website

Clothing retailers of Canada
Department stores of Canada
Companies based in Quebec City
Old Quebec
Retail companies established in 1840
Privately held companies of Canada